Clarence William Johnston (January 2, 1925 – April 23, 2021) was an American golf course architect and professional golfer who played on the PGA Tour.

Johnston was born in Donora, Pennsylvania on January 2, 1925, but moved to Ogden, Utah when he was four years old. Johnston served in the United States Navy. He played college golf at the University of Utah and turned professional in 1950. The biggest win of his playing career was at the 1958 Texas Open Invitational.

Johnston played on the Senior PGA Tour (now PGA Tour Champions) from 1980 to 1990 (full-time) and then a few tournaments a year through the 1990s.

After his days as a touring professional were over, Johnston became a golf course architect. He has designed several well-known courses in Arizona and Texas.

Johnston was inducted into the Utah Golf Hall of Fame in 1994 and the Arizona Golf Hall of Fame in 2018.

In November 2020, at the age of 95, Johnston was still playing golf three times a week at the Biltmore Links course with his friends. These regular golf partners included amateurs, professionals, and other close acquaintances. He was diagnosed with COVID-19 on December 4, 2020, at the Phoenix Mayo Clinic. He died at his son's house in Idaho, on April 23, 2021, at the age of 96.

Professional wins (15)

PGA Tour wins (2)

Other wins (13)
this list may be incomplete
1954 Utah Open
1958 Sahara Pro-Am
1961 Arizona Open
1967 Arizona Open
1972 Arizona Open, Colorado PGA Championship
1973 Colorado Open
Montana Open - 2 times 
Nevada Open - 4 times

Courses designed
The Hideout Golf Club, Lake Brownwood, Texas
The Dominion Country Club, San Antonio, Texas
The Links at Arizona Biltmore Country Club, Phoenix, Arizona
Point Hilton Golf Club on Lookout Mountain, Phoenix, Arizona
Rancho Mañana Golf Club, Cave Creek, Arizona
Tapatio Springs Resort, Boerne, Texas
Legacy Ridge Country Club, Bonham, Texas

References

External links

American male golfers
PGA Tour golfers
PGA Tour Champions golfers
Golf course architects
Golfers from Pennsylvania
Golfers from Utah
United States Navy personnel of World War II
Military personnel from Utah
People from Donora, Pennsylvania
Sportspeople from Ogden, Utah
1925 births
2021 deaths